Hapag may mean:
  Hamburg America Line, a former German shipping company: Hamburg Amerikanische Packetfahrt Actien-Gesellschaft (HAPAG)
 724 Hapag, a minor planet (asteroid)